Eucalyptus kartzoffiana, commonly known as the Araluen gum, is a species of medium-sized tree that is endemic to a small area of southeastern New South Wales. It has rough, fibrous or flaky bark on part or most of its trunk, lance-shaped or curved adult leaves, flower buds in groups of three, white flowers and sessile, bell-shaped fruit.

Description
It has rough, fibrous, scaly or flaky, greyish bark on part or most of the trunk, smooth white, grey or cream-coloured bark above. Flowering occurs in February and the flowers are white. The fruit is glaucous at first.

Taxonomy and naming
Eucalyptus kartzoffiana was first formally described in 1973 by Lawrie Johnson and Donald Blaxell from a specimen collected in 1978 by Johnson on the Braidwood road near Araluen. The description was published in Contributions from the New South Wales National Herbarium. The specific epithet (kartzoffiana) honours Michael Eugene Kartzoff.

Distribution and habitat
The Araluen gum has a restricted distribution on granite-derived soils south-east of Braidwood, where it grows in woodland and forest.

Conservation status
This eucalypt is classified as "vulnerable" under the Australian Government Environment Protection and Biodiversity Conservation Act 1999 and the New South Wales Government Biodiversity Conservation Act 2016. The main threats to the species include its small population size, land clearing, management of grazing land, roadside maintenance and herbicide use.

References

Myrtales of Australia
Flora of New South Wales
Trees of Australia